Songs from the Heart is the fifth studio album and fourth on-stage production by the group Celtic Woman, released on 16 January 2010.

Performers in Songs from the Heart are vocalists Chloë Agnew, Lynn Hilary, Lisa Kelly, Alex Sharpe and fiddler Máiréad Nesbitt. The German deluxe edition, released in January 2011, also features newer member (at the time) Lisa Lambe, as well as former members Órla Fallon and Méav Ní Mhaolchatha.

PBS special and DVD release background
Songs from the Heart was originally filmed as a TV special for American broadcaster PBS, as well as a DVD release, at Powerscourt House and Gardens near Enniskerry, County Wicklow, Ireland, in July 2009. The concert was filmed by Alex Coletti Productions and Brennus Productions with editing by the Windmill Lane Post Production studios in Dublin.

Like its predecessor A New Journey, the show was delayed by rain days before taking place; it also rained the day before, 'washing out' the rehearsals and forcing the performers to rehearse inside the main hall in the Powerscourt House. The concert was further delayed when the electrical generator powering the lights, cameras, and other electrical equipment failed during the song "Goodnight My Angel," requiring the show to stop while a second generator was sent for. The first generator was later fixed, allowing the show to continue with a restart of said song.

The DVD release and PBS special do not reprise the full concert, which composer and director David Downes mentioned was over two hours long. As the group did not have the rights to show all of the tracks performed during the recording of the PBS special and DVD release, the actual concert as shown was over one hour in length. Omitted songs that were performed included "Carolina Rua" and "You'll Be in My Heart".

The DVD also includes a 20-minute 'making-of' featurette showing the lead-up to the first show, starting three days before, where former CEO of the group Scott Porter mentions that Powerscourt was 'one of the most beautiful and challenging locations we've ever performed in'.

Track listing

Notes
 All songs arranged by David Downes. Downes also wrote and composed "The New Ground" from track 6 and track 13.
 Track 14 was written and composed especially for Celtic Woman by Brendan Graham and William Joseph.
 Track 5 was released as a single on iTunes in November 2009, around the same period of the broadcast of the PBS special.

Personnel
Celtic Woman
 Chloë Agnew - vocals
 Lynn Hilary - vocals
 Lisa Kelly - vocals
 Máiréad Nesbitt - fiddle
 Alex Sharpe - vocals
Band
 David Downes - grand piano, keyboards, whistles, percussion, backing vocals
 Des Moore - guitar, bouzouki
 Eoghan O'Neill - bass guitar
 Tommy Martin - uilleann pipes, whistles
 Ray Fean - drums, percussion
 Nicky Bailey - percussion
 Anthony Byrne - bagpipes
 Andrew Boland - pièna-flörten
Irish Film Orchestra
 John Page - conductor
 Alan Smale - concertmaster
 Martin Johnston - solo cello
Aontas Choral Ensemble
 Rosemary Collier - choral director
Black Raven Pipe Band
 Paul Russell - pipe major
Production
 David Downes - producer, arranger, orchestrator, additional engineering
 Andrew Boland - engineering, mixing
 Caroline Nesbitt - sleeve design
 Lili Forberg, Laurel Fisher, Joe Kelly - photography
 Recorded at Windmill Lane Studios 1 & 2, StudioTWO and RTÉ Studio 1, Dublin, Ireland
 Mixed in StudioTWO, Dublin, Ireland
 Mastered by Mazen Murad at Metropolis Studios, London

Charts

Weekly charts

Year-end charts

Certifications

References

External links

Celtic Woman albums
2010 albums
Manhattan Records albums